Torch Singer is a 1933 American Pre-Code Paramount Pictures film directed by Alexander Hall and George Somnes and starring Claudette Colbert, Ricardo Cortez, David Manners and Lyda Roberti. The screenplay was written by Lenore J. Coffee and Lynn Starling, based on the short story Mike by Grace Perkins, which was published in Liberty magazine (May 20–27, 1933). It was released on DVD (as part of a six disc set entitled "Pre-Code Hollywood Collection") on April 7, 2009, and by itself on August 5, 2014.

Synopsis
Sally Trent has an illegitimate child, but cannot support her and gives the baby up for adoption. The father, Michael Gardner, leaves for China not knowing about the baby, and she assumes he has abandoned her for life. She gets a job as a torch singer, changes her name to Mimi Benton, and becomes notorious for her drinking and philandering. Mimi fills in on a children's radio program as the character "Aunt Jenny," singing and telling bedtime stories, and eventually uses the airtime to find her long lost daughter, part with her wild lifestyle, and reunite with Michael.

Cast
Claudette Colbert as Sally Trent, aka Mimi Benton
Ricardo Cortez as Tony Cummings
David Manners as Michael "Mike" Gardner
Lyda Roberti as Dora Nichols
Baby LeRoy as Bobby (Dora's 1 year old baby) 
Charley Grapewin as Andrew "Juddy" Judson
Sam Godfrey as Harry, Radio Announcer
Florence Roberts as Mother Angelica
Virginia Hammond as Mrs. Julia Judson
Cora Sue Collins as Sally (5 years old) 
Helen Jerome Eddy as Miss Spaulding
Albert Conti as Carlotti
Ethel Griffies as Agatha Alden
Mildred Washington as Carrie
Carlena Beard as Sally

Quotes
Mimi Benton: "Well, I'll tell you what happened to her. While you were touring China, she went through hell. It's a nice place, you must go there someday."
Michael Gardner: "You've changed all right! You're selfish, hard." Mimi Benton: "Sure I am, just like glass. So hard, nothing'll cut it but diamonds. Come around some day with a fistful. Maybe we can get together."
Mimi Benton: "Don't ever let any man make a sucker out of you. Make him know what you're worth. Anything they get for nothing is always cheap."

See also
 Torch song

Notes

External links
 
 
 

1933 films
American black-and-white films
Films based on short fiction
Paramount Pictures films
American musical drama films
Films directed by Alexander Hall
1930s musical drama films
1933 drama films
1930s American films